Pray TV is a 1982 American Christian made-for-television drama film which aired on ABC starring John Ritter and Ned Beatty.   The project garnered controversy when Rev. Jerry Falwell, the prominent televangelist, undertook a public campaign in an attempt to keep the TV movie from airing.

Plot

A newly ordained minister accepts a summer job with a dynamic TV evangelist only to find deep conflicts between the latter's conventional activities servicing his community's spiritual needs and his power wielded as a TV celebrity.

Calls received to phone number
The telephone number advertised by Rev. Stone received 15,000 real calls.

Cast
John Ritter as Tom McPherson
Ned Beatty as Rev. Freddy Stone
Richard Kiley as Rev. Gus Keiffer
Madolyn Smith as Liz Oakes
Louise Latham as Mrs. Oakes
Jonathan Prince as Bill Oakes
Michael Currie as Artie Allman
Kenneth Tigar as Parker
Lois Hamilton as Bobbi Ellis
Jason Bernard as Everett
Frank Birney as Johnson
James Keane as Fats
Richard Kennedy as Announcer
Mel Tormé as himself
Devo as Dove, the Band of Love

References

External links

 

1982 television films
1982 films
1982 drama films
Films scored by Dennis McCarthy
Films directed by Robert Markowitz
Films about television people
Films about evangelicalism
Televangelism
American drama television films
1980s American films